The Tariff Act of 1890, commonly called the McKinley Tariff, was an act of the United States Congress, framed by then Representative William McKinley, that became law on October 1, 1890.<ref> Frank W. Taussig,  "The McKinley Tariff Act." Economic Journal.2 (1891): 326-350 online.</ref> The tariff raised the average duty on imports to almost fifty percent, an increase designed to protect domestic industries and workers from foreign competition, as promised in the Republican platform. It represented protectionism, a tactic supported by Republicans and denounced by Democrats. It was a major topics for fierce debate in the 1890 Congressional elections, which gave a Democratic landslide.

Democrats replaced the McKinley Tariff with the Wilson–Gorman Tariff Act in 1894, which lowered tariff rates.

Description

After 450 amendments, the Tariff Act of 1890 was passed and increased average duties across all imports from 38% to 49.5%. McKinley was known as the "Napoleon of Protection," and rates were raised on some goods and lowered on others, always in an attempt to protect American manufacturing interests. Changes in duties for specific products such as tinplates and wool were the most controversial ones and were emblematic of the spirit of the Tariff of 1890.

The Act eliminated tariffs altogether on certain items, with the threat of reinstatement as an enticement to get other countries to lower their tariffs on items imported from the US.

Eliminated tariffs
The Act removed tariffs on sugar, molasses, tea, coffee and hides but authorized the President to reinstate the tariffs if the items were exported from countries that treated U.S. exports in a "reciprocally unequal and unreasonable" fashion. The idea was "to secure reciprocal trade" by allowing the executive branch to use the threat of reimposing tariffs as a means to get other countries to lower their tariffs on U.S. exports. Although this delegation of power had the appearance of being an unconstitutional violation of the nondelegation doctrine, it was upheld by the Supreme Court in Field v. Clark in 1892, as authorizing the executive to act merely as an "agent" of Congress, rather than as a lawmaker itself. The President did not use the delegated power to re-impose tariffs on the five types of imported goods, but he used the threat of doing so to pass 10 treaties in which other countries reduced their tariffs on U.S. goods.

Tin-plates
Tin-plates were a major import for the United States; tens of millions of dollars in these goods entered the country each year.  In the preceding 20 years, tariff rates had been raised and dropped multiple times on tin-plates with no change in import levels, and domestic production had remained inconsequential. In a last attempt to stimulate the infant domestic tin-plate industry, the Act raised the duty level from 30% to 70%. It also included a unique provision that stated tin-plates should be admitted free of any duty after 1897 unless domestic production in any year reached one third of the imports in that year. The goal was for the duty to be protective or not to exist at all.

Wool
The new tariff provisions for wool and woolen goods were exceedingly protectionist. Wool was previously taxed based on a schedule: more valuable wool was taxed at a higher rate. Through a multitude of complicated tariff schedule revisions, the Act made almost all woolen goods subject to the maximum duty rate.

Also, the Act increased the tariff on carpet wool, a wool of very low quality not produced in the US. The government wanted to ensure that importers were not declaring higher-quality wool as carpet wool to evade the tariff.

Reactions
The tariff was not well received by Americans who suffered a steep increase in prices. In the 1890 election, Republicans lost their majority in the House with the number of seats they won reduced by nearly half, from 171 to 88. Also, in the 1892 presidential election, Harrison was soundly defeated by Grover Cleveland, and the Senate, House, and Presidency were all under Democratic control. Lawmakers immediately started drafting new tariff legislation, and in 1894, the Wilson-Gorman Tariff passed, which lowered US tariff averages.

The 1890 tariff was also poorly received abroad. Protectionists in the British Empire used it to argue for tariff retaliation and imperial trade preference. The McKinley Tariff had the effect of raising the bilateral American tariff toward Britain from 35% in 1890 to 43% in 1891, whereas the average American tariff actually fell on account of the McKinley Tariff placing a number of tropical commodities on the free list.

Background
Tariffs (taxes on foreign goods entering a country) served two purposes for the United States in the late 19th century.  One was to raise revenue for the federal government, and the other was to protect domestic manufacturers and workers from foreign competition, known as protectionism.

In December 1887, President Grover Cleveland, a Democrat, devoted his entire State of the Union Address to the issue of the tariff and called emphatically for the reduction of duties and the abolition of duties on raw materials. The speech succeeded in making the tariff and the idea of protectionism a true party matter.  In the 1888 election, the Republicans were victorious with the election of Benjamin Harrison and majorities in both the Senate and the House. For the sake of holding the party line, the Republicans felt obligated to pass stronger tariff legislation.

William McKinley, of Ohio, was defeated by Thomas Brackett Reed to be Speaker of the House after the 1888 elections.  McKinley instead became chairman of the House Ways and Means Committee and was responsible for framing a new tariff bill. He believed that a protectionist tariff had been mandated by the people through the election and that it was necessary for America's wealth and prosperity.

In addition to the protectionist debate, politicians were also concerned about the high revenue accruing from tariffs. After the American Civil War, tariffs remained elevated to raise revenue and to cover the high costs of the war. However, in the early 1880s, the federal government was running a large surplus. Both parties agreed that the surplus needed to lessen but disagreed about whether to raise or to lower tariffs to accomplish the same goal.

The Democrats' hypothesis stated that tariff revenue could be reduced by reducing the tariff rate. Conversely, the Republicans' belief was that by increasing the tariff, imports would be lessened, and total tariff revenue would drop. The debate would be known as the Great Tariff Debate of 1888.

Effects
Douglas Irwin's 1998 paper examines the validity of the opposite tariff hypotheses posed by the Republicans and Democrats in 1890. Irwin looked at historical data to estimate import demand elasticities and export supply elasticities for the US in the years before 1888. He then calculated that tariffs had not reached the maximum revenue rate and that a reduction, not a raise, in the tariff would have reduced revenue and the federal surplus. That confirmed the Democrats' hypothesis and refuted the Republicans'.

After he examined the actual tariff revenue data, he concluded that revenue decreased by about 4% from $225 million to $215 million, after the Tariff of 1890 increased rates. Irwin explains that to be due to a provision for raw sugar be moved to the duty-free list. Sugar was then the item that raised the most tariff revenue and so making it duty-free reduced revenue. If sugar is excluded from import calculations, the tariff revenue increased by 7.8%, from $170 million to $183 million.

Irwin concluded that the tariff hastened the development of domestic tinplate production by about a decade but also that the benefit to the industry was outweighed by the cost to consumers.

References

Further reading

 Eckes, Alfred E. Opening America's market: US foreign trade policy since 1776 (Univ of North Carolina Press, 1995). [Opening America's market online]
 Irwin, Douglas A. "Trade policy in American economic history." Annual Review of Economics 12 (2020): 23-44. online

Irwin, Douglas A. "Did late-nineteenth-century US tariffs promote infant industries? Evidence from the tinplate industry." Journal of Economic History 60.2 (2000): 335-360. online
 Irwin, Douglas A. "Higher tariffs, lower revenues? analyzing the fiscal aspects of 'the great tariff debate of 1888'."  Journal of Economic History 58.1 (1998): 59-72. online
 Irwin, Douglas A. "Tariffs and growth in late nineteenth century America." (NBER, 2000) [Irwin, Douglas A. "Tariffs and growth in late nineteenth century America." (2000). online].
 Morgan, H. Wayne. William McKinley and his America (Syracuse University Press, 1963). online
 Reitano, Joanne. Tariff Question in the Gilded Age: The Great Debate Of 1888 (Penn State Press, 2010). online
 Taussig, Frank W. "The McKinley Tariff Act." Economic Journal 1.2 (1891): 326-350. online
 Taussig, F. W. Tariff History Of The United States (1931) online
 Taussig, F. W. Some aspects of the tariff question: an examination of the development of American industries under protection (1931), covers all major industries online

International impact
 Grey, Earl. The Commercial Policy of the British Colonies and the McKinley Tariff (London: Macmillan, 1892). online
 Lawder, Robert H. Commerce between the United States & Canada, Observations on Reciprocity and the McKinley Tariff (Toronto: Monetary Times Printing, 1892). online
 Palen, Marc-William. "Protection, federation and union: The global impact of the McKinley tariff upon the British Empire, 1890–94." Journal of Imperial and Commonwealth History 38.3 (2010): 395-418 online.
 Rioux, Hubert. "Canada First vs. America First: Economic Nationalism and the Evolution of Canada-US Trade Relations." European Review of International Studies'' 6.3 (2019): 30-56. online

1890 in American law
Agriculture in Hawaii
United States federal trade legislation
1890 in international relations
October 1890 events